Spanish Mump is a subglacial mound in east-central British Columbia, Canada, located in the northeastern corner of Wells Gray Provincial Park.

See also
 List of volcanoes in Canada
 Volcanism of Canada
 Volcanism of Western Canada

References

Volcanoes of British Columbia
One-thousanders of British Columbia
Subglacial mounds of Canada
Pleistocene volcanoes
Monogenetic volcanoes